Richard "Rick" Howland is a Canadian actor known for his role as Trick on Lost Girl and Harry Buttman (a parody of Gary Bettman) in Bon Cop, Bad Cop.

Career 
Howland's first credited acting role appears in the feature film "To Catch A Yeti," opposite Meat Loaf. While at York University, he formed the comedy troupe the Four Strombones, which performed in comedy clubs around Toronto for more than a decade. A few of his roles have played off his 4' 7" (1.40 m) stature. He has Osteogenesis Imperfecta.

He played Trick in Lost Girl, which played for five seasons. Additionally, Howland played Harry Buttman in Bon Cop Bad Cop, and Jayne Eastwood's son in Endless Grind. Howland has co-written a sitcom with Adam Nashman called Rick's Life, an industry based show that offers up the funny through Rick's own unique perspective; in addition to writing and directing his first short film, "Underwritten," for the 48 Hour Film Festival.

Howland is also a songwriter, with two self-recorded albums available on iTunes.

Filmography 
 To Catch a Yeti (1995) – as Blubber
 The Cellar (1997) (short film) – as Zoltan
 The Adventures of Shirley Holmes (1998): Episode "The Case of the Bouncing Baby" – as Bernie Szabo
 John Woo's Once a Thief (1998): Episode "Shaken Not Stirred" – as Actor
 Traders (1999): Episode "The Last Good Deal" – as Rob 'Tiny' Lewis
 The Jesse Ventura Story (1999) – as Wrestler
 Sufferance (2000) (short film) – as The Butler
 Club Land (2001) – as Gump
 The Newsroom (2002): "Escape from the Newsroom" (TV Movie) – as Autograph Hound No. 2
 Sue Thomas: F.B.Eye (2004): Episode "Concrete Evidence" – as Sal Roland
 Short Tongue Freddy (2005) (short film) – as Freddy
 Crazy for Christmas (2005) – as Kenny
 Santa Baby (2006) (short film) – as Mr. Elf
 Bon Cop, Bad Cop (2006) – as Harry Buttman
 Citizen Duane (2006) – as Irate Pedestrian
 The Roommate (2007) – as Paul
 Tin Man (2007) (mini-series) – as Red Katt
 Billable Hours (2007): Episodes "The Sting" & "15 Minutes of Shame" – as Computer Tech
 Murdoch Mysteries (2008): Episode "Child's Play" – as Miles Gorman
 Billable Hours (2008): Episodes "Lil' War Photo" & "Shortstop" – as Keach
 Midgets Vs. Mascots (2009) – as Big Red Bush
 An Insignificant Man (2011) (short film) – as Hungover Clown
 Sanctuary (2011): Episode "Resistance" – as Galvo
 Lost Girl (2010–15) – as Trick; Main role
 Lost Girl Finale Pre-Show (2012) (Showcase TV special) – as self
 Top Chef Canada (2012): Episode "Lights, Camera, Action!" – as self
 Lost Girl ConFAEdential (2013) (Showcase TV special) – as self
 Prophecy (2013) (Lost Girl webisode) – as Trick
 Lost Girl: An Evening at the Clubhouse (2013) (Showcase TV special) – as self
 Killjoys (TV series) (2016): Episode "How to Kill Friends and Influence People" - as Dej Serafan Archive Keeper

References

External links 
 
 
 Rick Howland iTunes albums

Year of birth missing (living people)
Living people
Canadian male film actors
Canadian male television actors
Actors with dwarfism
People with osteogenesis imperfecta